The four-story China Merchants Bank Building is a historical building on the Bund, Shanghai, China. It was built in 1907, and later became the Hospital for the Shanghai Changjiang Navigation Company.

External links
The Bund

1907 establishments in China
Commercial buildings completed in 1907
Buildings and structures in Shanghai
The Bund